The Disputation of Paris, also known as the Trial of the Talmud, took place in 1240 at the court of King Louis IX of France. It followed the work of Nicholas Donin, a Jewish convert to Christianity who translated the Talmud and pressed 35 charges against it to Pope Gregory IX by quoting a series of allegedly blasphemous passages about Jesus, Mary, or Christianity. Four rabbis defended the Talmud against Donin's accusations.

Background
As part of its evangelistic efforts, the Catholic Church sought to win the beliefs of the Jews through debate. Western Christianity in the 13th century was developing its intellectual acumen and had assimilated the challenges of Aristotle through the works of Thomas Aquinas. In order to flex its intellectual muscle, the Church sought to engage the Jews in debate, hoping that the Jews would see what they considered the intellectual superiority of Christianity.

Paul Johnson cites a significant difference between the Jewish and Christian sides of the debate. Christianity had developed a detailed theological system; the teachings were clear and therefore vulnerable to attack. Judaism had a relative absence of dogmatic theology; it did have many negative dogmas to combat idolatry but did not have a developed positive theology. "The Jews had a way of concentrating on life and pushing death—and its dogmas—into the background."

Disputers
The debate started on 12 June 1240. Nicholas Donin, a member of the Franciscan Order and a Jewish convert to Christianity, represented the Christian side. He had translated statements by Talmudic sages and pressed 35 charges against the Talmud as a whole to Pope Gregory IX by quoting a series of allegedly blasphemous passages about Christianity. He also selected what he said were injunctions of Talmudic sages permitting Jews to kill non-Jews, to deceive Christians, and to break promises made to them without scruples.

The Catholic Church had shown little interest in the Talmud until Donin presented his translation to Gregory IX. The Pope was surprised that the Jews relied on texts other than the Torah, and that those other texts contained alleged blasphemies against Christianity. This lack of interest also characterized the French monarchy which chiefly considered the Jews as a potential source of income before 1230.

Rabbis Yechiel of Paris, Moses of Coucy, Judah of Melun, and Samuel ben Solomon of Château-Thierry—four of the most distinguished rabbis of France—represented the Jewish side of the debate.

Trial
The terms of the disputation demanded that the four rabbis defend the Talmud against Donin's accusations that it contained blasphemies against the Christian religion, attacks on Christians themselves, blasphemies against God, and obscene folklore. The attacks on Christianity were from passages referring to Jesus and Mary. There is a passage, for example, of someone named Jesus who was sent to hell to be boiled in excrement for eternity. The Jews denied that this is the Jesus of the New Testament, stating "not every Louis born in France is king."

Among the obscene folklore is a story that Adam copulated with each of the animals before finding Eve. Noah, according to the Talmudic legends, was castrated by his son Ham. It was common for Christians to equate the religion of the Jews with the Mosaic faith of the Old Testament, so the Church was surprised to realize that the Jews had developed an authoritative Talmud to complement their understanding of the Bible.

Twentieth-century Jewish scholar Hyam Maccoby alleges that the purpose of the Paris disputation was to rid the Jews of their "belief in the Talmud", in order that they might return to Old Testament Judaism and eventually embrace Christianity. He says that the hostility of the Church during this disputation had less to do with the Church's attitude and more to do with Nicholas Donin. Donin's argumentation exploited controversies that were debated within Judaism at the time, according to Maccoby. Maccoby also suggests that the disputation may have been motivated by Donin's previous affiliations with the Karaite Jews, and that his motivations for joining the Church involved his desire to attack rabbinic tradition.

Outcome
The Disputation set in place a train of events which culminated in a burning of a great number of Jewish holy texts, on June 17, 1242. "One estimate is that the 24 wagonloads included up to 10,000 volumes of Hebrew manuscripts, a startling number when one considers that the printing press did not yet exist, so that all copies of a work had to be written out by hand." The burning of the texts was apparently witnessed by the Maharam of Rothenburg, who wrote about the incident.

Donin's translation of statements taken from the Talmud into French changed the Christian perception about Jews. Christians had viewed the Jews as the followers of the Old Testament who honored the Law of Moses and the prophets, but the alleged blasphemies included among the Talmudic texts indicated that Jewish understandings of the Old Testament differed from the Christian understanding. Louis IX stated that only skilled clerics could conduct a disputation with Jews, but that laymen should plunge a sword into those who speak ill of the Christ.

See also
 Criticism of Judaism
 Disputation of Barcelona (1263)
 Disputation of Tortosa (1413–1414)
 Jesus in the Talmud
 Toledot Yeshu
 Yonah Gerondi

References

1240s in France
Antisemitism in France
Book burnings
Criticism of Judaism
Paris
History of Paris
History of the Jews in Europe
Jewish–Christian debate
Medieval Paris
Louis IX of France